Corey A. Black (born January 11, 1969, in Westminster, California) is a retired Champion jockey in American Thoroughbred horse racing.

Born in Westminster, California, Black won his first race as a professional apprentice jockey on October 16, 1985, during the Oak Tree Racing Association meet at Santa Anita Park. A Champion that year, he led all apprentice jockeys in United States racing in purse money won. During a fifteen-year career, Black rode primarily in California where he won important races, including the 1993 Hollywood Gold Cup aboard Best Pal.

In the summer of 1987, and again in 1992, Corey Black rode in France where he won a number of conditions races.

Like many in his profession, Corey Black battled weight gain that eventually was a factor in his retirement at age thirty-one on November 26, 2000. Following retirement he worked as an agent for a short time, acting for jockeys Gary Stevens and Brice Blanc. In 2002, he was hired to work on the set of the motion picture, Seabiscuit. He served as a stunt double for actor Tobey Maguire, who he taught the posturing of a professional jockey, and played the role of the jockey (Harry Richards) on Rosemont, William duPont, Jr.'s horse that beat Seabiscuit in the 1937 Santa Anita Handicap. Black has worked as an exercise rider and has been an analyst on the TVG Network horse racing broadcasts. 

Corey Black was a member of Board of Don MacBeth Memorial Jockey Fund, an organization that raises money to assist injured and disabled riders.

External links
 Video at YouTube of Corey Black winning the 1993 Hollywood Gold Cup aboard Best Pal

References

1969 births
Living people
American jockeys
People from Westminster, California
Sportspeople from Orange County, California